William Shakespeare's play Romeo and Juliet, set in Verona, Italy, features the eponymous protagonists Romeo Montague and Juliet Capulet. The cast of characters also includes members of their respective families and households; Prince Escalus, the city's ruler, and his kinsman, Count Paris; and various unaffiliated characters such as Friar Laurence and the Chorus. In addition, the play contains two ghost characters (Petruchio and Valentine) and an unseen character (Rosaline).

House of Escalus

Prince Escalus
Prince Escalus, the Prince of Verona, is the desperate resolver of the feuding families. He is based on the actual Scaliger family which ruled Verona, possibly on Bartolomeo I. Escalus is the voice of authority in Verona. He appears only three times within the text and only to administer justice following major events in the feud between the Capulet and Montague families. He first punishes Capulet and Montague for the quarrel between Tybalt, Benvolio, and a handful of servants. He returns too late to stop the fatal brawls between Tybalt and Mercutio and, subsequently, Tybalt and Romeo. Escalus is prepared to execute Romeo for his offence—Romeo's killing of Tybalt—but lightens the sentence to lifetime banishment from Verona, when Benvolio insists that Tybalt started the quarrel by murdering Mercutio, a kinsman to the prince. He yells at Lord Montague for engaging in the feud, which really is the root cause that led to Romeo killing Tybalt. Prince Escalus returns in the final scene—V.iii—following the double suicide of Romeo and Juliet, and at last declares Lord Montague and Lord Capulet guilty of Romeo and Juliet's deaths. Escalus angrily berates them that their violent and useless feud resulted in the deaths of not only their own loved ones (Lady Montague, Romeo, Juliet, and Tybalt), but also in the deaths of his loved ones (Mercutio and Paris). He pardons Friar Lawrence for his role in Juliet's death. He curses the feud that kills Romeo and Juliet just before the Lords come to peace with each other. In the end, Prince Escalus becomes very happy that the feud has finally ended, even if with a heavy price.

In 1968, in Franco Zeffirelli's film adaptation of the play, the part of the Prince was portrayed by Robert Stephens. In 1996, in Baz Luhrmann's film adaptation of the play, he is depicted as the Police Chief of Verona Beach and was portrayed by Vondie Curtis-Hall.

Count Paris

Count Paris is a kinsman of Prince Escalus and seeks to marry Juliet. He is described as handsome, somewhat self-absorbed, and very wealthy.

Paris makes his first appearance in Act I, Scene II, where he expresses his wish to make Juliet his wife and the mother of his children.

In 1968, in Franco Zeffirelli's film adaptation of the play, the part of Paris was portrayed by Roberto Bisacco, and in
the 1996 Baz Luhrmann film it was played by Paul Rudd.

Mercutio

Mercutio is the cousin of Prince Escalus and Count Paris, and is a close friend of Romeo and his cousin Benvolio. He supports and fights on the Montague side of the feud, and just like a Montague, hates the Capulet family. The invitation to the Capulet's party reveals that he has a brother named Valentine. Mercutio is apt to make long, drawn out speeches (the most famous of which is the Queen Mab speech), and is generally thought to be reckless, a jester, and a free spirit. Due to his reckless and flamboyant personality, Mercutio is one of Shakespeare's most popular characters. Mercutio is the instigator of many fights with his rather mean spirited humor, and often insults Tybalt, a renowned swordsman. It is Tybalt's temper that leads to Mercutio's death, and Romeo's banishment and the tragedy that follows.

After Romeo receives a death threat from Tybalt, Mercutio expects Romeo to engage Tybalt in a duel. However, Romeo refuses to fight Tybalt, as Tybalt is Juliet's cousin and therefore his kinsman. Not knowing this, Mercutio is incensed, and decides to fight Tybalt himself. Romeo, not wanting his best friend or his relative to get hurt, intervenes, causing Mercutio to be killed by Tybalt stabbing under Romeo's arm.

Before he dies, Mercutio casts "a plague o' both your houses!" He makes one final pun before he dies: "Ask for me tomorrow, and you shall find me a grave man". In revenge for the murder of his best friend, Romeo slays Tybalt, thus leading to Romeo's banishment from Verona and the increasingly tragic turn of events that follows.

In 1968, in Franco Zeffirelli's film adaptation of the play, the part of Mercutio was portrayed by John McEnery.

Page to Paris
Another page accompanies Paris to the Capulet's crypt when he goes to mourn Juliet. He stands guard as Paris enters, ordered to "whistle then to me, / As signal that thou hear'st something approach". When Romeo and Paris break into a brawl, the page runs away to call the Watch. He returns with the Watch too late to stop the fray and later testifies to the Prince of Paris' intentions.

House of Capulet
The Capulet family (in Italian, "Capuleti") in the play was named after an actual political faction of the 13th century.
Notably, the Capulet family is often portrayed as the more aggressive family, as much of the conflict is caused by them. They are also more developed, since more attention is given to their family life.

Lord Capulet

Lord Capulet is the patriarch of the Capulet family, the father of Juliet, and uncle of Tybalt. He is very wealthy. He is sometimes commanding but also convivial, as at the ball: when Tybalt tries to duel with Romeo, Capulet tries to calm him and then threatens to throw him out of the family if he does not control his temper; he does the same to his daughter later in the play.

Capulet believes he knows what is best for Juliet. He says his consent to the marriage depends upon what she wants and tells Count Paris that if he wants to marry Juliet he should wait a while then ask her. Later, however, when Juliet is grieving over Romeo's departure, Capulet thinks her sorrow is due to Tybalt's death, and in a misguided attempt to cheer her up, he wants to surprise her by arranging a marriage between her and Count Paris. The catch is that she has to be "ruled" by her father and to accept the proposal. When she refuses to become Paris' "joyful bride", saying that she can "never be proud of what she hates", Capulet becomes furious; threatens to make her a street urchin; calls her a "hilding" , "unworthy", "young baggage", a "disobedient wretch", a "green-sickness carrion", and "tallow-face"; and says God's giving Juliet to them was a "curse" and he now realizes he and his wife had one child too many when Juliet was born (in the earlier poem The Tragic History of Romeus and Juliet). In addition to threatening to turn her out, he threatens to sentence her to rot away in prison if she does not obey her parents' orders. He then storms away, and his wife also rejects Juliet before following him. He fixes the day of the marriage for Thursday and suddenly advances it to Wednesday out of anger and impulse. His actions indicate that his daughter's wants were irrelevant all the way up to the point when he sees her unconscious on her bed (presumably dead) and later, when she is truly dead during the play's final scene. It is he who asks Lord Montague for his hand to end the feud between their families.

In 1968, in Franco Zeffirelli's film adaptation of the play, the part of Lord Capulet was portrayed by Paul Hardwick.

Lady Capulet

Capulet's wife is the matriarch of the house of Capulet and Juliet's mother. She plays a larger role than Montague's wife, appearing in several scenes. In Act 1, Scene 3, she speaks to Juliet about the marriage of her daughter and Paris, we see this as she compares him to a book, and Juliet is the cover. However, in Scene four, she is pleased about Count Paris' "interest" in her daughter. When Tybalt is killed in Act 3, she expresses extreme grief and a strong desire for revenge on Romeo by wishing death upon him. In Act 3, Scene 5, she becomes very angry with Juliet for refusing to marry Paris and coldly rejects her, saying: "Talk not to me, for I'll not speak a word; do as thou wilt, for I am done with thee". By the final act, she is nearly overcome by the tragic events of the play, this is where the grief-stricken mother comes out. We know Juliet's mother bore her first child by the time she was 14, Juliet's age, and her husband is many years older than she. Calling her "Lady Capulet" is a later addition; it is an echo of Juliet's form of address in 3.5.65: "my lady mother". In the first texts the stage direction and speech headings can be "mother", "wife", or even "old lady", but nowhere "Lady Capulet".

In 1968, in Franco Zeffirelli's film adaptation of the play, the part of Lady Capulet was portrayed by Natasha Parry.

Juliet

Juliet Capulet, the female protagonist, is the only daughter of Capulet, the patriarch of the Capulet family. As a child, she was cared for by a nurse, who is now her confidante.

Juliet dies at the end of the play, and the sacred lovers are reunited on the same deathbed. Both their families realize what they had done by trying to separate the star crossed lovers with the effect that the Capulets and Montagues are reunited and their fighting ends.

In 1968, in Franco Zeffirelli's film adaptation of the play, the part of Juliet is played by Olivia Hussey.

Tybalt

Tybalt is the son of Lady Capulet's brother and Juliet's hot-headed first cousin. As a skilled swordsman, he serves as the story's principal antagonist. Tybalt is angered by the insult of Romeo and Benvolio's uninvited presence at the ball in the Capulets' home. Tybalt shares the same name as the character Tibert/Tybalt the "Prince of Cats" in Reynard the Fox, a point of both mockery and compliment to him in the play. While Mercutio repeatedly calls Tybalt "Prince of Cats" (referring to Tybalt's speed and agility with the sword), Mercutio is also insulting Tybalt – the phrase refers not only to Reynard but to the  word cazzo (pr. CAT-so), an informal term for penis.

Tybalt is first seen coming to the aid of his servants who are being attacked by the Montagues' servants. He is also present at Capulet's feast in act one, scene five and is the first to recognize Romeo. His last appearance is in act 3 scene 1, wherein Mercutio insults Tybalt and ends up fighting with him. Tybalt kills Mercutio and, in retaliation, Romeo rages and kills Tybalt, resulting in Romeo's banishment.

In 1968, in Franco Zeffirelli's film adaptation of the play, the part of Tybalt was portrayed by Michael York.

Nurse

The nurse is a major character in the play, and like the Friar she is a neutral character. There has been speculation about her name, as Capulet refers to as "Angelica", but the line can be addressed to either the nurse or Lady Capulet. She is the personal servant (and former nurse) of Juliet's. As the primary person who raised Juliet, she is Juliet's confidante and effectively more of a mother to the girl than Lady Capulet. 

In 1968, in Franco Zeffirelli's film adaptation of the play, the part of the nurse was portrayed by Pat Heywood.

Peter
Peter is the personal servant of the nurse. He appears to be a loyal servant, always quick to obey the nurse. He is chastised for not fighting Mercutio for the nurse's honour but insists that he "saw no man use you a pleasure; if I had, / my weapon should quickly have been out". He appears again in act four, scene five in a brief comic relief scene with a number of musicians.

In 1968, in Franco Zeffirelli's film adaptation of the play, the part of Peter is played by Roy Holder.

Gregory and Sampson

Gregory and Sampson are the Capulet servants. Gregory is originally hesitant to start a fight. Sampson, however, bites his thumb at Abram, "Which is a disgrace to them, if they bear it". The Montagues then retaliate in earnest. Benvolio arrives to break up the fight but ends up fighting with Tybalt. Both Gregory and Sampson appear to be friends of their master Tybalt's.

In the opening scene, the two engage in a dialogue full of puns on "coal" and "eye", each intending to outdo the other and get each other ready to fight Montagues. The rhetorical form is called stychomythia, wherein characters participate in a short, quick exchanges of one-upmanship. Their discussion and brawl in this scene set the stage for the rivalry and hatred which fills the rest of the play.

In 1968, in Franco Zeffirelli's film adaptation of the play, the part of Gregory was played by Dyson Lovell and the part of Sampson by Richard Warwick.

Anthony, Potpan, unnamed Servants
Anthony, Potpan, and two other servants to the Capulet family play out a short comic scene in act one, scene five, arguing over the preparations for Capulet's feast. Capulet's servants are referenced again in act four, scene one; Capulet orders them to begin preparations for another party: the wedding of Juliet and Paris.

Servant to Capulet

A servant to Capulet is sent to deliver party invitations to a number of nobles and friends to Capulet. While walking, he comes upon Romeo and Benvolio and asks them to read the list for him, as he cannot read. As a thank you, he invites the boys to "come and crush a cup of wine," not realizing that they are Montagues. This character may have been intended to be the same as Peter, and is usually identified in scripts either as Peter or as a Clown.

Old Capulet
Old Capulet is Capulet's cousin. He appears as an elderly man sitting with Capulet in the feast.

House of Montague
The Montague family (in Italian, "Montecchi") was an actual political faction of the 13th century.
The Montagues are generally portrayed as the 'better' of the two families, as they are not seen to be provoking fights and are often found trying to avoid fighting whenever they could, and occasionally found trying to dissuade the fighters to return to peace.

Lord Montague
The father of Romeo. He has the same social status as Lord Capulet, with whom he is in feud, and is also extremely wealthy. Montague clearly loves his son deeply and at the beginning of the play, worries for him as he recounts to Benvolio his attempts to find out the source of his depression. He wishes Benvolio better luck. After Romeo kills Tybalt, Montague pleads with the Prince to spare him of execution as Romeo did only what the law would have done, since Tybalt killed Mercutio. He appears again at the end of the play to mourn Romeo, having already lost his wife to grief.

Lady Montague
Montague's wife, the matriarch of the house of Montague, and the mother of Romeo and aunt of Benvolio. She appears twice within the play: in act one, scene one she first restrains Montague from entering the quarrel himself, and later speaks with Benvolio about the same quarrel. She returns with her husband and the Prince in act three, scene one to see what the trouble is, and is there informed of Romeo's banishment. She dies of grief offstage soon after (mentioned in act five). She is very protective of her son Romeo and is very happy when Benvolio tells her that Romeo was not involved in the brawl that happened between the Capulets and Montagues. However, Romeo doesn't feel very close to her as he is unable to seek advice from her. As with Capulet's wife, calling her "Lady Montague" is a later invention not supported by the earliest texts.

In 1968, in Franco Zeffirelli's film adaptation of the play, the part of Lady Montague was played by Esmeralda Ruspoli.

Romeo

[[File:Romeo and juliet brown.jpg|thumb|upright|right|An 1870 oil painting by Ford Madox Brown depicting Romeo and Juliet'''s famous balcony scene]]
In the beginning of the play, Romeo, the male protagonist, pines for an unrequited love, Rosaline. To cheer him up, his cousin and friend Benvolio and Mercutio take him to the Capulets' celebration in disguise, where he meets and falls in love with the Capulets' only daughter, Juliet. Later that night, he and Juliet meet secretly and pledge to marry, despite their families' long-standing feud. They marry the following day, but their union is soon thrown into chaos by their families; Juliet's cousin Tybalt duels and kills Romeo's friend Mercutio, throwing Romeo into such a rage that he kills Tybalt, and the Prince of Verona subsequently banishes him. Meanwhile, Juliet's father plans to marry her off to Paris, a local aristocrat, within the next few days, threatening to turn her out on the streets if she doesn't follow through. Desperate, Juliet begs Romeo's confidant, Friar Laurence, to help her to escape the forced marriage. Laurence does so by giving her a potion that puts her in a deathlike coma. The plan works, but too soon for Romeo to learn of it; he genuinely believes Juliet to be dead, and so resolves to commit suicide, by drinking the bottle of poison (illegally bought from the Apothecary upon hearing the news of Juliet's "death"). Romeo's final words were "Thus with a kiss I die". He kills himself at Juliet's grave, moments before she awakes; she kills herself in turn shortly thereafter.

Benvolio

Montague's nephew and Romeo's cousin. Benvolio and Romeo are both friends of Mercutio, a kinsman to Prince Escalus. Benvolio seems to have little sympathy with the feud, trying unsuccessfully to back down from a fight with Tybalt, and the duels that end in Mercutio and Tybalt's death. Benvolio spends most of Act I attempting to distract his cousin from his infatuation with Rosaline, but following the first appearance of Mercutio in I.iv, he and Mercutio become more closely aligned until III.i. In that scene, he drags the fatally wounded Mercutio offstage, before returning to inform Romeo of Mercutio's death and the Prince of the course of Mercutio's and Tybalt's deaths. Benvolio then disappears from the play (though, as a Montague, he may implicitly be included in the stage direction in the final scene "Enter Lord Montague and others", and he is sometimes doubled with Balthasar). Though he ultimately disappears from the play without much notice, he is a crucial character if only in that he is the only child of the new generation from either family to survive the play (as Romeo, Juliet, Paris, Mercutio, and Tybalt are dead).

In 1968, in Franco Zeffirelli's film adaptation of the play, the part of Benvolio is played by Bruce Robinson.

Balthasar
Balthasar is Romeo's manservant and trusted friend. They have a brotherly relationship, which is identified when Balthasar tells Romeo that Juliet is "dead". While he is not directly referenced in the first scene of the play, the directions call for two Montague servants to quarrel with Sampson and Gregory. He then comes back in Act V Scene 1 telling Romeo about Juliet's supposedly dead. Later Friar Laurence runs past Balthasar and asks him where Romeo is. Balthasar tells him that he is inside the Capulets' tomb. He later supports Friar Laurence's recollection of the preceding events by explaining that Romeo entered the tomb and demanded to be alone.

In 1968, in Franco Zeffirelli's film adaptation of the play, the part of Balthasar was portrayed by Keith Skinner.

Abram
Abram is a servant of the Montague household. He appears in Act 1, Scene 1, where he and another servant (presumably Balthasar) are provoked into a fight with Gregory and Sampson when the latter bites his thumb at them.

Other characters
Friar Laurence

Friar Laurence plays the part of an advisor and mentor to Romeo, along with aiding in major plot developments.

Alone, the innocent Friar gives us foreshadowing with his soliloquy about plants and their similarities to humans. When Romeo requests that the Friar marry him to Juliet, he is shocked, because only days before, Romeo had been infatuated with Rosaline, a woman who did not return his love. Nevertheless, Friar Lawrence decides to marry Romeo and Juliet in the attempt to end the civil feud between the Capulets and the Montagues.

When Romeo is banished and flees to Mantua for murdering Tybalt (who had previously murdered Mercutio), he tries to help the two lovers get back together using a death-emulating potion to fake Juliet's death.<ref>Shakespeare: Romeo and Juliet'; 3.5.91–101</ref> The Friar's letter to Romeo does not reach him because the people of Mantua suspect the messenger came from a house where the plague reigns, and the Friar is unable to arrive at the Capulet's monument in time. Romeo kills Count Paris, whom he finds weeping near Juliet's corpse, then commits suicide, by drinking poison that he bought from an impoverished apothecary, over what he thinks is Juliet's dead body. Friar Lawrence arrives just as Juliet awakes from her chemically induced slumber. He urges Juliet not to be rash, and to join a society of nuns, but he hears a noise from outside and then flees from the tomb. Juliet then kills herself with Romeo's dagger, completing the tragedy. The Friar is forced to return to the tomb, where he recounts the entire story to Prince Escalus, and all the Montagues and Capulets. As he finishes, the prince proclaims, "We have still known thee for a holy man".

Friar John
Friar John calls at the door of Friar Laurence's cell, "Holy Franciscan friar! brother, ho!" (5.2.1). Friar Laurence comes out and immediately asks about Romeo: "Welcome from Mantua! What says Romeo? / Or, if his mind be writ, give me his letter" (5.2.3–4). Friar John explains that he sought out another friar for company and found him in a house where he was visiting the sick, whereupon the health authorities, fearing there was pestilence in the house, confined both friars in the house so they wouldn't infect others. The authorities wouldn't even allow Friar John to use a messenger to send the letter back to Friar Laurence.

Chorus

A Chorus gives the opening prologue and one other speech, both in the form of a Shakespearean sonnet.

The Chorus is an omniscient character. It appears at the top of the play to fill the audience in on the ancient quarrel between the, "Two households, both alike in dignity / In fair Verona, where we lay our scene". It returns as a prologue to act two to foreshadow the tragic turn of events about to befall the new romance between the title characters.

The Chorus only appears in the Quarto versions, not in the First Folio.

Apothecary
The Apothecary is a pharmacist in Mantua who reluctantly sells Romeo's poison, only because he is poor and in desperate need of money.

Watchmen
The Watch of Verona takes the form of three watchmen. The First Watch appears to be the constable, who orders the Second and Third to "search about the churchyard!" Unusual for a Shakespearean watch group, they appear to be a relatively intelligent unit, managing to capture and detain Balthasar and Friar Laurence in the churchyard. They then testify to the Prince to their role in the murder and suicide scene.

Musicians
Musicians serving in the Capulet household.

Citizens of Verona
A number of citizens emerge during Act I, Scene I to break apart the fight between some Capulet and Montague servants. They appear again in Act III, Scene I to discover the slain body of Tybalt, at which point they place Benvolio under citizen's arrest until the Prince's swift entrance.

Unseen and ghost characters

Petruchio
Petruchio is a guest at the Capulet feast. He is notable only in that he is the only ghost character confirmed by Shakespeare to be present. When the party ends and Juliet inquires towards Romeo's identity, the Nurse attempts to avoid the subject by answering that Juliet is pointing at "the young Petruchio". Later, he is with Tybalt when he fatally wounds Mercutio, and a few scripts identify a Capulet with one line by that name. Petruchio is also the name of a major character in Shakespeare's earlier work, The Taming of the Shrew.

Rosaline

Rosaline is an unseen character and niece of Capulet. Although silent, her role is important: her lover, Romeo, first spots her cousin Juliet while trying to catch a glimpse of Rosaline at a Capulet gathering.

Before Juliet, Romeo was deeply intrigued with another woman that didn't return his feelings. Scholars generally compare Romeo's short-lived love of Rosaline with his later love of Juliet. Rosaline means "fair rose". The poetry he writes for Rosaline is much weaker than that for Juliet. Scholars believe his early experience with Rosaline prepares him for his relationship with Juliet. Later performances of Romeo and Juliet have painted different pictures of Romeo and Rosaline's relationship, with filmmakers experimenting by making Rosaline a more visible character.

In 1968, in Franco Zeffirelli's film adaptation of the play, the part of Rosaline was portrayed by Paola Tedesco.

Valentine
Valentine is Mercutio's brother, briefly mentioned as a guest at the Capulet feast where Romeo and Juliet meet. He is a ghost character with no speaking parts, and his only possible appearance is at the Capulet feast among the guests. "Valentine" has been taken to mean "lover" or "brother", and is associated with these attributes in several stories and histories. Scholars have pointed out that Valentine is more strongly connected to a major character than other ghosts, as he is given a direct connection to his brother. Although he has a very small role in Shakespeare's play, earlier versions of the story gave him no role or mention at all. In fact, they gave even Mercutio a very minor role. Shakespeare was the first English dramatist to use the name "Valentine" on stage, in his earlier plays, Titus Andronicus and The Two Gentlemen of Verona. In Titus, Valentine plays a minor role, but in Two Gentlemen, he is one of the title characters. Incidentally, the Valentine of Two Gentlemen borrows heavily from Arthur Brooke's Romeus in The Tragicall Historye of Romeus and Juliet, which Shakespeare later used to create Romeo and Juliet. Brooke's version made Mercutio a rival for Juliet's love. Shakespeare's addition of Valentine as Mercutio's brother diffuses this rivalry. Thus, because the first time we hear of Mercutio he is associated with Valentine, rather than Juliet, he is changed from a rival to a friend and brotherly figure of Romeo.

References

 
Lists of theatre characters
Shakespearean characters